Pelochrista caecimaculana is a moth belonging to the family Tortricidae. The species was first described by Jacob Hübner in 1799.

It is native to Eurasia.

References

Eucosmini